The International Joint Conference on Automated Reasoning (IJCAR) is a series of conferences on the topics of automated reasoning, automated deduction, and related fields. It is organized semi-regularly  as a merger of other meetings. IJCAR replaces those independent conferences in the years it takes place. The conference is organized by CADE Inc., and CADE has always been one of the conferences partaking in IJCAR.

 The first IJCAR was held in Siena, Italy in 2001 as a merger of CADE, FTP, and TABLEAUX.
 The second IJCAR was held in Cork, Ireland in 2004 as a merger of CADE, FTP, TABLEAUX, FroCoS and CALCULEMUS.
 The third IJCAR was held as an independent subconference  of the fourth Federated Logic Conference in Seattle, United States, and merged CADE, FTP, TABLEAUX, FroCoS and TPHOLs.
 The fourth IJCAR was held in Sydney, Australia in 2008, and merged CADE, FroCoS, FTP and TABLEAUX.
 The fifth IJCAR was held in 2010 as an independent subconference  of the fifth Federated Logic Conference in Edinburgh, UK, and merged CADE, FTP, TABLEAUX, and FroCoS.
 The sixth IJCAR was held in Manchester, UK, as part of the Alan Turing Year 2012, and was collocated with the Alan Turing Centenary Conference. It again merged  CADE, FTP, TABLEAUX, and FroCoS.
 The seventh IJCAR was held in Vienna, Austria, as part of the Vienna Summer of Logic in 2014, and merged CADE, TABLEAUX, and FroCoS.
 The eighth IJCAR was held in Coimbra, Portugal,  in 2016, and merged CADE, TABLEAUX, and FroCoS.

External links
 IJCAR Home Page
 IJCAR-2006 Home Page
 IJCAR-2008 Home Page
 IJCAR 2016 Home Page

Theoretical computer science conferences
Logic conferences